Little Island railway station (sometimes spelled as Littleisland, which is the name that station signs display) serves the area of Little Island in County Cork.

It is a station on the Cork to Cobh or Midleton commuter service.

Description
The station has no toilets and has no ticket office. The ticket vending machine at the station is on each platform and a leap card system is also available.

A footbridge connects the two platforms, but both platforms have separate ramp access; a roundabout route involving the slip road off the nearby N25 allows passengers step-free access from the car park to the Cork-bound platform.

History
The station opened on 10 November 1859.

References

External links
Irish Rail Little Island Station Website

Iarnród Éireann stations in County Cork
Railway stations in County Cork
Railway stations opened in 1859